This is a list of mosques in Kerala, India.

Srambia or Niskarappalli
Srambia is a small and cute mosque built in ancient time of wooden material.  They are often found near paddy fields and waterbodies like ponds.  Most of them are built by a single family or hamlet.  Their unique feature is smallness of size and the antique value. 
Notable Srambias
 

 Utharam Palli, Ettammel, Madayi, Kannur District
 Pucholamad Cheroor Srambia, Vengara, Malappuram
 Puzhakkara Srambia, Chaliyam, Feroke

See also 
Srambia
List of the oldest mosques in the world

Kerala
Kerala
Mosques in Kerala
Mosques